The Beautiful Few is an Australian band, originally formed in 1993 and going through many line-up changes .  The band's first demo tape was recorded by Quincy McLean in August 1993 at the Bakehouse Studios, and have released 6 albums, 1 EP and numerous singles over the course of their career.

People
 Edmondo Ammendola (of Augie March) - guitars, keyboards, bass, drum programming, effects
 Karen Anson - keyboards, backing vocals
 Kieran Carroll - vocals, lyrics (1993 - present)
 Troy Parker - drums, guitars, synthesizer, bass.(2002-present)
 Matt Tracy - Keyboards, Guitar, Dreamy Looks
 Clinton "Skinny" Bale - Bass, long hair
 Jason T Parker - Bass, Guitar, Beard
 Pete McEwan - Guitar, Robert Smithesq voice

Releases
 Dancing Under The Lights CD EP released May 1995 (Fatal Shore) recorded by Andy Stewart at Stable Sound and Charnwood Studios
 Push Predictions Compilation CD 1995 ‘Roses Above The Stones’ from ‘Dancing Under The Lights’
 And What Year Was This? cassette EP released January 1998
 The Little Truths/The Shoreline and The Apple Tree 7″ split single w/Droplet
 The October Lovers CD LP released October 1999 (Hip To Hate)
 Something To Do, Someone To Love, Something To Look Forward Too released December 2001 (BigRig Records)
 One Month In Every Twelve (promo single) released December 2002
 Metal For Melbourne & other stories (Big Rig Records) released February 2003
 This Kiss and One Month In Every Twelve (Aberdeen Remix) - Promo Single released November 2003
 Days Like Humphrey B Bear (Promo Single) released October  2004
 If You Change Your City… You Are Sure To Change Your Style (Big Rig Records) released January 2005
 d.i.y heartbreak
 the nights you did your hair.

External links
 The band's website (archived)

Australian indie rock groups